The 2011-2012 ABA season was the eleventh season of the American Basketball Association that lasted from about November 2011, the finish of the regular season in late February, and the championship playoffs at the end of March 2012, which the Jacksonville Giants won by beating the South Carolina Warriors. 

Originally, over ninety teams were scheduled to compete during the 2011-12 season.  However, much of that list included teams that had no plans to start the season and teams which disappeared before the season began.  Of the teams listed, East Kentucky Energy and Chi-Town Bulldogs disappeared before the season began.  Midwest Flames folded, with players and coaches joining another team.  St. Louis Pioneers and Indiana Diesels both left to join the Premier Basketball League.  Tampa Bay Rain and Greencastle Golden Knights were originally set to start the season, but were moved to expansion teams for the next season.

This season was the first full season where the league released scores from games played.

League standings
From USBasket.com

References

American Basketball Association (2000–present) seasons
ABA